Epimetasia gregori is a moth in the family Crambidae. It was described by Hans Georg Amsel in 1970. It is found in Afghanistan.

Subspecies
Epimetasia gregori gregori
Epimetasia gregori gulbaharalis Amsel, 1970
Epimetasia gregori panjaoalis Amsel, 1970

References

Moths described in 1970
Odontiini